Green Petrol, (GPSEI) is one of the Iranian largest providers of fuel retailing solutions.
It's a supplier of fuel dispensers, point of sale systems, Station Equipment, and Fuel Tanker Level Gauge systems and support services. The company's headquarters is in Tehran, IRAN with sales, manufacturing, research, development and service locations in different parts of Iran.

History
The company was founded under the name Green Petrol in 2005 by Javad Hajibeygi and Masoud Tajrishi. In 2006 Green Petrol started to cooperate with NPS co.

Products
 Green Petrol supplies automatic tank gauging and fuel management systems
 Green Petrol is a manufacturer of dispenser pumps and marketer of Submersible pumps, Tank level gauge, Electronic Counter Counter and other equipment.

See also
 National Iranian Oil Refining and Distribution Company
 National Iranian Oil Company
 Official NIORDC Website
 Iran's Refinery Expansion Projects

References

Manufacturing companies based in Tehran